The Embassy of Cuba in Berlin (Embajada de Cuba) is the diplomatic mission of the Republic of Cuba to Germany. The embassy is based in Stavangerstraße 20 im Berlin Prenzlauer Berg, District of Pankow. An embassy office is also in Bonn, in Kennedyallee 22–24. Ramón Ignacio Ripoll Diaz has been ambassador of Cuba to Germany since December 15, 2017.

References

Cuba
Diplomatic missions of Cuba